Commentary is a monthly American magazine on religion, Judaism, and politics, as well as social and cultural issues. Founded by the American Jewish Committee in 1945 under Elliot E. Cohen, editor from 1945 to 1959, Commentary magazine developed into the leading postwar journal of Jewish affairs. The periodical strove to construct a new American Jewish identity while processing the events of the Holocaust, the formation of the State of Israel, and the Cold War. Norman Podhoretz edited the magazine in its heyday from 1960 to 1995. Besides its coverage of cultural issues, Commentary provided a voice for the anti-Stalinist left. As Podhoretz shifted from his original ideological beliefs as a liberal Democrat to neoconservatism in the 1970s and 1980s, he moved the magazine with him to the right and toward the Republican Party.

History

Founding and early years
Commentary was the successor to the Contemporary Jewish Record, which was published by the American Jewish Committee (AJC) and ran from 1938 to 1945. When the Records editor died in 1944, the AJC consulted with New York intellectuals including Daniel Bell and Lionel Trilling: they recommended that the AJC hire Elliot Cohen, who had been the editor of a Jewish cultural magazine and was then a fundraiser, to start a new journal. Cohen designed Commentary to reconnect assimilated Jews and Jewish intellectuals with the broader, more traditional and very liberal Jewish community. At the same time the magazine would bring the ideas of the young Jewish New York intellectuals to a wider audience. It demonstrated that Jewish intellectuals, and by extension all American Jews, had turned away from their past political radicalism to embrace mainstream U.S. culture and values. Cohen stated his grand design in the first issue:

As Podhoretz put it, Commentary was to lead the Jewish intellectuals "out of the desert of alienation ... and into the promised land of democratic, pluralistic, and prosperous America". Cohen brought on board strong editors who themselves wrote important essays, including Irving Kristol; art critic Clement Greenberg; film and cultural critic Robert Warshow; and sociologist Nathan Glazer. Commentary published such rising stars as Hannah Arendt, Daniel Bell, Sidney Hook, and Irving Howe.

Although many or even most of the editors and writers had been socialists, Trotskyites, or Stalinists in the past, that was no longer tolerated. Commentary articles were anti-Communist and also anti-McCarthyite; it identified and attacked any perceived weakness among liberals on Cold War issues, backing President Harry Truman's policies such as the Truman Doctrine, the Marshall Plan, and NATO. The "soft-on-Communism" position of the Congress of Industrial Organizations (CIO) and Henry A. Wallace came under steady attack. Liberals who hated Joseph McCarthy were annoyed when Irving Kristol wrote at the height of the controversy that "there is one thing that the American people know about Senator McCarthy: he, like them, is unequivocally anti-Communist. About the spokesmen for American liberalism, they feel they know no such thing."

Norman Podhoretz
In the late 1950s the magazine sagged, as Cohen suffered from mental illness and committed suicide. A protégé of Lionel Trilling, Norman Podhoretz took over in 1960, running the magazine with an iron hand until his retirement in 1995. Podhoretz reduced the space given to Jewish issues and moved Commentarys ideology to the left. Circulation rose to 60,000 as the magazine became a mainstay of the Washington liberal elite in the heyday of Presidents John F. Kennedy and Lyndon B. Johnson.

The emergence of the New Left, which was bitterly hostile to Johnson, to capitalism and to universities, angered Podhoretz for what he perceived as its shallowness and hostility to Israel in the 1967 Six-Day War. Articles attacked the New Left on questions ranging from crime, the nature of art, drugs, poverty, to the new egalitarianism; Commentary said that the New Left was a dangerous anti-American, anti-liberal, and anti-Semitic force. Daniel Patrick Moynihan used Commentary to attack the Watts riots and liberals who defended it as a just revolution. The shift helped define the emerging neoconservative movement and gave space to disillusioned liberals.

As the readership base shifted to the right, Commentary filled a vacuum for conservative intellectuals, who otherwise were reliant on William F. Buckley Jr.'s National Review. In March 1975 Moynihan's article "The United States in Opposition" urged America to vigorously defend liberal democratic principles when they were attacked by Soviet Bloc and Third World dictatorships at the United Nations. Moynihan was appointed ambassador to the UN by President Gerald Ford in 1975 and was elected to the United States Senate in 1976. Jeane Kirkpatrick's November 1979 denunciation of the foreign policy of President Jimmy Carter, "Dictatorships and Double Standards", impressed Ronald Reagan, who defeated Carter in 1980. In 1981 Reagan appointed Kirkpatrick ambassador to the United Nations and Commentary reached the apogee of its influence.

Recent years
Norman Podhoretz, who served as editor-in-chief until 1995, was editor-at-large until January 2009. Neal Kozodoy, at Commentary since 1966, was editor between 1995 and January 2009; he is the magazine's current editor-at-large. Since January 2009 the journal has been edited by John Podhoretz, Norman's son.

The magazine ceased to be affiliated with the AJC in 2007, when Commentary, Inc., an independent 501(c)(3) non-profit enterprise, took over as publisher.

In 2011, the journal donated its archives from 1945 to 1995 to the Harry Ransom Center at the University of Texas at Austin. These included letters and essay revisions.

Commentary prints letters to the editor that comment on various articles three issues earlier. The more critical and lengthy letters tend to be printed first and the more praiseful letters last. The author of the article being discussed almost always replies in a follow-up to his critics. Each issue has several reviews of books on varying topics. Commentary usually assigns a review to books written by notable contributors to the magazine.

Popular culture
Commentary has been referred to in several Woody Allen films. In Annie Hall (1977), Allen (as character Alvy Singer) makes a pun by saying that he heard that Dissent and Commentary had merged to form "Dysentery." In Bananas (1971), as an old lady is threatened on a subway car, Allen hides his face by holding up an issue of Commentary. This image is featured at the New York Transit Museum in Brooklyn Heights. In Crimes and Misdemeanors, an issue of Commentary lies on a character's bedside table.

In his sitcom Anything but Love, stand-up comedian Richard Lewis was often shown holding or reading a copy of Commentary.

Reception and influence
American-Israeli journalist Benjamin Balint and former editor at Commentary described the magazine as the "contentious magazine that transformed the Jewish left into the neoconservative right". Historian and literary critic Richard Pells said that "no other journal of the past half century has been so consistently influential, or so central to the major debates that have transformed the political and intellectual life of the United States."

Notes

References

 Podhoretz, Norman. Breaking Ranks (1979), memoir
 Nathan Glazer, Thomas L. Jeffers, Richard Gid Powers, Fred Siegel, Terry Teachout, Ruth R. Wisse et al. in Commentary in American Life, ed. Murray Friedman. Philadelphia: Temple University Press, 2005

Bibliography

 Balint, Benjamin. Running Commentary: The Contentious Magazine That Transformed the Jewish Left Into the Neoconservative Right (PublicAffairs; 2010) 290 pages
 Ehrman, John. "Commentary, the Public Interest, and the Problem of Jewish Conservatism", American Jewish History 87.2&3 (1999) 159–181. online in Project MUSE, scholarly article by conservative historian
 Franczak, Michael. "Losing the Battle, Winning the War: Neoconservatives versus the New International Economic Order, 1974–82," Diplomatic History, Volume 43, Issue 5, November 2019, Pages 867–889, Losing the Battle, Winning the War: Neoconservatives versus the New International Economic Order, 1974–82.
 Jeffers, Thomas L. Norman Podhoretz: A Biography (Cambridge University Press, 2010)

Further reading 
 Weekly Standard article on Commentary
 The New York Sun article on who attends the annual Commentary-hosted gathering
 More bio bits on Cohen and Commentary history
 Vallentine Mitchell Publishers Forthcoming Titles Nathan Abrams, Commentary Magazine 1945–1959: 'A Journal of Significant Thought and Opinion. Bio on Cohen and Commentary's early history]

External links
 
 Commentary Finding Aid at the Harry Ransom Center

1945 establishments in New York (state)
Conservative magazines published in the United States
Jewish magazines published in the United States
Magazines established in 1945
Magazines published in New York City
Neoconservatism
Political magazines published in the United States
American Jewish Committee